Unorthodox may refer to:

Music
 Unorthodox (band), a doom metal band from Maryland
 Unorthodox (Edge of Sanity album), 1992
 Unorthodox (Snow Tha Product album), 2011
 "Unorthodox" (Joey Badass song), 2013
 "Unorthodox" (Wretch 32 song), 2011

Television
 Unorthodox (miniseries), a 2020 Netflix miniseries loosely based on Deborah Feldman's memoir (see below)
 "Unorthodox" (Law & Order: Special Victims Unit), an episode

Other uses
 Unorthodox (podcast), a Jewish podcast hosted by Mark Oppenheimer, Stephanie Butnick, and Liel Leibovitz
 Unorthodox: The Scandalous Rejection of My Hasidic Roots, a 2012 memoir by Deborah Feldman
 Unorthodox Australian Poet, pen name of Garry W. Gosney (born 1955)
 Unorthodox Engineers, the subject of a series of science fiction short stories by Colin Kapp
 Left-arm unorthodox spin, a style of bowling in the sport of cricket
 Unorthodox chess piece, a chess piece not used in conventional chess, but used in certain chess variants

See also
 Heterodoxy, any opinions or doctrines at variance with an official or orthodox position
 Orthodox (disambiguation)